The Mound railway station was a former railway station on the Far North Line near the head of Loch Fleet in Scotland.

History

Among the intermediate stations was one at The Mound, which opened with the line. The station took its name from the nearby road embankment engineered in 1817 by Thomas Telford across the head of Loch Fleet, which is now on the route of the A9 road. In 1873–74 the station had one platform on the southern side of the line; on the northern side of the line there were two goods sidings.

The sorter was unhurt as he was working in the front half of the carriage at the time.

The platform for the Dornoch branch curved away from that of the main line. In 1906 the station had two platforms, one for each route; there was a passing loop on the main line, and the platform for the Dornoch branch had a run-round loop. Adjacent to the main line passing loop were two goods sidings, and there were three sidings to the west of the station, two of which were on the southern side of the line.

Trains called at most intermediate stations, although some were request stops. There were no trains on Sundays.

The Dornoch branch closed on 13 June 1960, and The Mound station closed the same day. The line remains open, and the nearest station is now Golspie.

Routes

Notes

References

External links
 The Mound Station on navigable O.S. map

Disused railway stations in Sutherland
Former Highland Railway stations
Railway stations in Great Britain opened in 1868
Railway stations in Great Britain closed in 1960